Mahmoud Khattab Younes (5 March 1915 – 27 June 2001) was an Egyptian epee, foil and sabre fencer. He competed at the 1948 and 1952 Summer Olympics.

References

External links
 

1915 births
2001 deaths
Egyptian male foil fencers
Egyptian male sabre fencers
Olympic fencers of Egypt
Fencers at the 1948 Summer Olympics
Fencers at the 1952 Summer Olympics
Egyptian male épée fencers
20th-century Egyptian people